Strikeforce: Shamrock vs. Diaz was a mixed martial arts event held by Strikeforce on April 11, 2009 at the HP Pavilion in San Jose, California. It was the first event promoted by Strikeforce after their acquisition of assets from the defunct EliteXC promotion through its parent company ProElite. It aired on the Showtime cable network and online through Strikeforce All Access. 
Gus Johnson, Mauro Ranallo and Pat Miletich were commentating during the broadcast and Jimmy Lennon Jr. was the ring announcer. The official attendance was announced to be 14,409. The event drew an estimated 364,000 viewers on Showtime.

Event
Gilbert Melendez was originally scheduled to fight Josh Thomson before Thomson broke his leg while sparring. Rodrigo Damm was brought in as a replacement instead.

Weigh-ins
All fighters except Cris Cyborg and Brandon Michaels made their contracted weight during the official weigh-ins on April 10. Cyborg was fined 20% of her fight purse by the California State Athletic Commission for not making weight with half of it going to Akano.

Results

Reported Payout

The following is a list of fighter salaries as provided by the California State Athletic Commission. The figures do not include deductions for items such as insurance, licenses and taxes. Additionally, the figures do not include money paid by sponsors, which can often be a substantial portion of a fighter's income.

Gilbert Melendez: $49,890 (no win bonus) def. Rodrigo Damm: $9,190
Nick Diaz: $39,950 ($10,000 win bonus) def. Frank Shamrock: $369,790
Scott Smith: $49,940 ($25,000 win bonus) def. Benji Radach: $16,940
Brett Rogers: $39,940 ($20,000 win bonus) def. Ron "Abongo" Humphrey: $3,205
Cris Cyborg: $18,000 ($10,000 win bonus) def. Hitomi Akano: $1,450
Luke Rockhold: $6,000 ($3,000 win bonus) def. Buck Meredith: $1,540
Eric Lawson: $9,950 ($2,000 win bonus) def. Waylon Kennell: $1,950
Raul Castillo: $7,890 ($3,500 win bonus) def. Brandon Michaels: $1,500
James Terry: $3,940 ($2,000 win bonus) def. Zak Bucia: $1,500
Shingo Kohara: $940 (no win bonus) def. Jeremy Tavares: $940

See also
 Strikeforce (mixed martial arts)
 List of Strikeforce champions
 List of Strikeforce events
 2009 in Strikeforce

References

External links
 Strikeforce Homepage
 Showtime Sports Shamrock Vs. Diaz

Shamrock vs. Diaz
2009 in mixed martial arts
Mixed martial arts in San Jose, California
2009 in sports in California